Paratropididae, also known as baldlegged spiders, is a small family of mygalomorph spiders first described by Eugène Simon in 1889. They are more closely related to tarantulas and allies, than to most other 'true' spiders (araneomorphs).

Genera

, the World Spider Catalog accepts the following genera: 
Anisaspis Simon, 1892 – Saint Vincent and the Grenadines
Anisaspoides F. O. Pickard-Cambridge, 1896 – Brazil
Melloina Brignoli, 1985 – Venezuela, Panama
Paratropis Simon, 1889 – South America
Stormtropis Perafán, Galvis & Pérez-Miles, 2019

References

 
Mygalomorphae families